James Morgan (born February 28, 1997) is an American football quarterback for the Pittsburgh Maulers of the United States Football League (USFL). He played college football at Florida International and Bowling Green before being drafted by the New York Jets in the fourth round of the 2020 NFL Draft.

College career
A three-star recruit from Ashwaubenon High School in suburban Green Bay, Wisconsin, Morgan chose Bowling Green for coach Dino Babers. Morgan redshirted his freshman year, and after that season, Babers left for Syracuse. After two years of new coach Mike Jinks' Air Raid offense, Morgan decided to transfer after the 2017 season, eventually landing on Florida International as his new school. Morgan emailed a transfer pitch to 20 schools, and FIU coach Bryn Renner was the only person who responded to the email. Due to Morgan finishing his prelaw degree during his three years at Bowling Green, he was eligible immediately at FIU as a graduate transfer.

After his senior season, Morgan played in the 2020 East–West Shrine Bowl, throwing a touchdown and helping the East team to victory. He also earned an invite to the 2020 NFL Combine.

Professional career

New York Jets
Morgan was drafted by the New York Jets in the fourth round with the 125th overall pick of the 2020 NFL Draft.

On August 31, 2021, Morgan was waived by the Jets.

Carolina Panthers
On September 2, 2021, Morgan was signed to the Carolina Panthers practice squad. He was released on November 12, 2021.

Pittsburgh Steelers
On November 15, 2021, Morgan was signed to the Pittsburgh Steelers practice squad. He was released on November 23, 2021.

New York Jets (second stint)
On November 24, 2021, Morgan was signed to the New York Jets practice squad, but was released six days later.

Indianapolis Colts
On December 6, 2021, Morgan was signed to the Indianapolis Colts practice squad. He signed a reserve/future contract on January 10, 2022. He was released on May 23, 2022.

Pittsburgh Maulers 
Morgan signed with the Pittsburgh Maulers of the United States Football League on September 26, 2022.

Arizona Cardinals
On December 20, 2022, the Arizona Cardinals signed Morgan to their practice squad.

Pittsburgh Maulers (second stint)
Morgan re-signed with the Maulers following his stint with the Cardinals on January 14, 2023.

Personal life
Morgan also played basketball and won a state championship in the 4x400 meter relay at Ashwaubenon High School. After his football career is over, Morgan plans on entering law school.

References

External links

 Bowling Green Falcons bio
 FIU Panthers bio

1997 births
Living people
Players of American football from Wisconsin
Sportspeople from Green Bay, Wisconsin
American football quarterbacks
Arizona Cardinals players
Bowling Green Falcons football players
FIU Panthers football players
New York Jets players
Carolina Panthers players
Pittsburgh Steelers players
Indianapolis Colts players
Pittsburgh Maulers (2022) players